Viru-Jaagupi is a small borough in Vinni Parish, Lääne-Viru County, Estonia. As of the 2011 Census, the settlement's population was 404.

References

Boroughs and small boroughs in Estonia
Populated places in Lääne-Viru County
Vinni Parish